Air pirate (also known as sky pirate) is a stock character from science fiction and fantasy.

Air pirate may also refer to:

A person who commits air piracy, the unlawful seizure of an aircraft by an individual or a group
Air Pirates, a former group of cartoonists 
The Air Pirates (film), 1920 German film
The Air Pirates, a nickname for the 1st Attack-Reconnaissance Battalion (AH-64) of the 211th Aviation Regiment (United States)

See also
 
Sky pirate (disambiguation)
 Pirate (disambiguation)
Skyjacker (disambiguation)